The women's 24.2 km individual time trial competition at the 2002 Asian Games was held on 30 September at the Road Cycle Race Stadium.

Schedule
All times are Korea Standard Time (UTC+09:00)

Results 
Legend
DNS — Did not start

References

External links 
Results

Road Women ITT